Schweppes Cola is a brand of cola produced by Schweppes. It was, at first, available mainly in Australia, but it was eventually made available around the world. The taste is similar to the now-defunct Count Cola. The product was widely available in supermarkets & small take-away food outlets. In Australia, the product was discontinued when Schweppes obtained a license to produce Pepsi products in Australia. Schweppes Cola is currently owned and distributed by Dr Pepper Snapple Group. Today, the product can be found in Canada and other countries.

External links
Schweppe's Swiss site

Cola brands